The 1937 Yukon general election was held on 27 August 1937 to elect the three members of the Yukon Territorial Council. The council was non-partisan and had merely an advisory role to the federally appointed Commissioner.

Members
Dawson - John MacDonald
Mayo - Ernest Corp
Whitehorse - George Wilson

References

1937
1937 elections in Canada
Election
August 1937 events